Arthur William "Otto" Krueger (September 17, 1876 – February 20, 1961) was a Major League Baseball player. He batted and threw right-handed.

He was born in Chicago, Illinois and died in St. Louis, Missouri.

Krueger was nicknamed "Oom Paul" after the president of the Transvaal, Paul Kruger, reflecting the strong American interest in the South African War.

External links

1876 births
1961 deaths
Major League Baseball third basemen
Cleveland Spiders players
Philadelphia Phillies players
Pittsburgh Pirates players
St. Louis Cardinals players
San Antonio Missionaries players
Grand Rapids Furniture Makers players
Springfield Wanderers players
Columbus Senators players
Fort Wayne Indians players
Toledo Mud Hens players
Providence Grays (minor league) players
Kansas City Blues (baseball) players
Denver Grizzlies (baseball) players
Fresno Raisin Growers players
San Jose Prune Pickers players
East Liverpool (minor league baseball) players
Lawrence Colts players
Galveston Sand Crabs players
Scranton Miners players
Baseball players from Chicago
19th-century baseball players